Brienno is a comune (municipality) in the Province of Como in the Italian region Lombardy, located about  north of Milan and about  northeast of Como.

Brienno borders the following municipalities: Argegno, Carate Urio, Laglio, Nesso, Schignano.

References

External links
 Official website

Cities and towns in Lombardy